Ahia! is an extended play by the Italian band Pinguini Tattici Nucleari. It was released on 4 December 2020 by Sony Music Italy.

The release of the EP was preceded by the singles "La storia infinita" and "Scooby Doo", as well as by the novel of the same name written by frontman Riccardo Zanotti published on 3 November 2020.

Ahia! debuted at number five on the Italian Albums Chart and peaked at number two four weeks later. The EP was certified quadruple-platinum by the Federazione Industria Musicale Italiana.

Track listing

Charts

Weekly charts

Year-end charts

Certifications

References 

Italian-language EPs
Pinguini Tattici Nucleari albums
2020 EPs